Congiopodus is a genus of marine ray-finned fishes belonging to the family Congiopodidae, the pigfishes or horsefishes. These fishes are found in the southern Atlantic and Pacific oceans.

Taxonomy
Congiopodus was first formally described as a genus in 1811 by the English naturalist George Perry when he described Congiopodus percatus, the type species by monotypy. Subsequently, Perry's species was shown to be a junior synonym of Blennius torvus which had been described by the Dutch zoologist  Laurens Theodorus Gronow in 1772, with an erroneous type locality of the Indian Ocean given for this southern African species. The genus is the type genus of the family Congiopodidae, and some authorities regard this family as monogeneric, but the 5th edition of Fishes of the World classifies three other genera within this family. The family is placed in the  suborder Scorpaenoidei which in turn is classified within the order Scorpaeniformes in that book but other authorities classify Scorpaenoidei within the Perciformes. The name of the genus was not explained by Perry but may be a combination of the Greek gongulos, meaning "round", and podus, which means "foot", maybe referring to the roundish pelvic fins of C. percatus.

Species
There are currently six recognised species in this genus:
 Congiopodus coriaceus Paulin & Moreland, 1979 (Deepsea pigfish)
 Congiopodus kieneri (Sauvage, 1878)
 Congiopodus leucopaecilus (J. Richardson, 1846) (Southern pigfish)
 Congiopodus peruvianus (G. Cuvier, 1829) (Horsefish)
 Congiopodus spinifer (A. Smith, 1839) (Spinenose horsefish)
 Congiopodus torvus (Gronow, 1772) (Smooth horsefish)

Characteristics
Congiopodus pigfishes have a compressed body with a prominent snout, a terminal mouth and a single nostril on each side. It has small gill openings over the pectoral fins. They sometimes have no scales and, if they are present, they are tiny and spiny. The pelvic and pectoral fins have narrow bases and few unbranched fin rays. There are no sharp spines in the anal fin while the dorsal fin has between 14 and 21 spines and 11 and 14 soft rays.

Distribution and habitat
Congiopodus pigfishes are found in the southern Pacific and southern Atlantic Oceans. They are demersal fishes with some species in shallow coastal waters and others living in deeper waters.

References

External links

Congiopodidae
Taxa named by George Perry (naturalist)